Willy Martin Martinussen (born 21 July 1938) is a Norwegian sociologist.

Martinussen was born in Vestvågøy and graduated from the University of Oslo with a mag.art. degree (PhD equivalent) in 1965. He worked at the Institute for Social Research from 1963 to 1977, and was hired at the University of Trondheim (which was later merged into the Norwegian University of Science and Technology) in 1977.

References

1938 births
Living people
Norwegian sociologists
University of Oslo alumni
Academic staff of the Norwegian University of Science and Technology
People from Vestvågøy